Longleg is a 1990 novel by Australian author Glenda Adams.

Awards

Miles Franklin Literary Award, 1991: shortlisted 
NBC Banjo Awards, NBC Banjo Award for Fiction, 1991: joint winner 
The Age Book of the Year Award, Imaginative Writing Prize, 1990: winner

Reviews
"The New York Times" Book review

References

Middlemiss.org

1990 Australian novels